Akulovo is a rural locality (a village) in Kiprevskoye Rural Settlement, Kirzhachsky District, Vladimir Oblast, Russia. The population was 30 as of 2010. There are 8 streets.

Geography 
Akulovo is located 15 km southeast of Kirzhach (the district's administrative centre) by road. Trokhino is the nearest rural locality.

References 

Rural localities in Kirzhachsky District